Borgo Vercelli is a comune (municipality) in the Province of Vercelli in the Italian region Piedmont, located about  northeast of Turin and about  northeast of Vercelli.

Borgo Vercelli borders the following municipalities: Casalino, Casalvolone, Vercelli, Villata, and Vinzaglio.

The Battle of Vercellae is traditionally deemed to have occurred here in 101 BC. The economy is based on the production of rice.

People
 Blessed Enrichetta Alfieri (1891-1951), a Roman Catholic professed religious of the Sisters of Charity of Saint Jeanne-Antide Thouret

References

External links
 Official website